The Popular Front for the Liberation of Bahrain was an underground political party in Bahrain with origins in the Arab Nationalist Movement. Its members were inclined towards the leftist Marxist trend within the ANM. It was created after the Popular Front for the Liberation of Oman and the Arabian Gulf was reconstituted into two separate organizations as the Popular Front for the Liberation of Oman and the Popular Front for the Liberation of Bahrain. Several PFLB members participated in the Dhofar Rebellion in Oman.

In 2000, PFLB members established the National Democratic Action Society, the first ever officially licensed political organization in any of the Arab states of the Persian Gulf. The PFLB was replaced by the NDAS.

See also
Layla Fakhro
 March Intifada
List of political parties in Bahrain
 National Union Committee
 Ibrahim Sharif

References

External links
History of the Popular Front in Bahrain

1974 establishments in Bahrain
Arab nationalism in Bahrain
Arab nationalist militant groups
Arab Nationalist Movement breakaway groups
Arab socialist political parties
Communist parties in Bahrain
National liberation movements
Political parties disestablished in 2001
Political parties established in 1974
Political parties in Bahrain
Popular fronts
2001 disestablishments in Bahrain